This is a list of public housing estates (including Private Sector Participation Scheme (PSPS), Home Ownership Scheme (HOS) and Tenants' Purchase Scheme (TPS) in Tin Shui Wai New Town, Hong Kong.

Overview

Tin Chak Estate

Tin Chak Estate is a public housing estate in Tin Shui Wai, Yuen Long, New Territories, Hong Kong. It comprises 6 residential buildings completed in 2001.

Tin Ching Estate

Tin Ching Estate is a public housing estate in Tin Shui Wai. It is divided into 2 phases and consists of 7 residential buildings completed in 2008 and 2010 respectively.

Tin Chung Court

Tin Chung Court is a HOS court in Tin Shui Wai, located near Tin Wah Estate. It comprises 15 blocks completed in 1999 and 2002 respectively.

Short-piling scandal
In 1999, the piles of Blocks K (Chung Po House) and L (Chung Ho House) were found to be shortened by up to seven meters compared with the standard requirement. Foundation strengthening works was then carried out in the block and completed in 2002. 640 units in the two blocks was sold to the public in 2009.

Tin Fu Court

Tin Fu Court is a HOS court in Tin Shui Wai, located near Tin Yan Estate, Tin Yuet Estate and Tin Yat Estate. It comprises 16 Concord-type, 41-storeyed blocks completed in 2001 and 2007 respectively.

Short-piling scandal
In 1999, the piles of Block J (Chui Fu House) were found to be shortened by up to seven meters compared with the standard requirement. Foundation strengthening works was then carried out in the block and completed in 2002. It was resold to the public in 2007.

Tin Lai Court

Tin Lai Court is a HOS estate in Tin Shui Wai, near Tin Tsz Estate. It has only one Harmony-typed block built in 1997.

Tin Heng Estate

Tin Heng Estate is the northernmost Housing Authority public rental housing estate of Tin Shui Wai, located near and Hong Kong Wetland Park. It has totally 14 residential buildings completed in 2001.

Heng Lok House was put under lockdown due to Covid pandemic between 2 and 3 February 2021. Heng Chui House and Heng Chun House were sealed on 27 February 2022.

Tin Oi Court

Tin Oi Court is a HOS court in Tin Shui Estate, Tin Shui Wai. It has only two blocks completed in 1993.

Tin Shing Court

Tin Shing Court is a HOS court in Tin Shui Wai, located near Tin Yiu Estate and MTR Tin Shui Wai station. It has totally 17 residential buildings completed in 1999.

Tin Shui Estate

Tin Shui Estate is a public housing estate in Tin Shui Wai. It is the second public housing estate in Tin Shui Wai New Town. It is divided into Tin Shui (I) Estate and Tin Shui (II) Estate, and consists of 12 residential buildings completed in 1993.

Tin Tsz Estate

Tin Tsz Estate is a public housing estate in Tin Shui Wai. It has 4 residential buildings completed in 1997 and contains 3,400 rental flats of sizes ranging from 12.8 to 43.3m2. Its authorized population is 9,400 in 2009.

Tin Wah Estate

Tin Wah Estate is a public housing estate in Tin Shui Wai. The estate consists of 7 residential buildings completed in 1999.

Tin Yan Estate

Tin Yan Estate is a public housing estate in Tin Shui Wai.

The estate consists of 8 residential buildings completed in 2002 and 2004 respectively. Four of them were originally designed as an Interim Housing estate, but they were renovated to become a public housing estate in 2004. During the SARS outbreak in 2003, Block 2 and 3 were furnished as temporary quarters for frontline healthcare staff.

Tin Yau Court

Tin Yau Court is a HOS court in Tin Shui Wai, near Tin Yiu Estate. It consists of 3 blocks built in 1992.

Tin Yat Estate

Tin Yat Estate is a public housing estate in Tin Shui Wai. It consists of 9 residential buildings completed in 2001.

Tin Yiu Estate

Tin Yiu Estate is a public housing estate in Tin Shui Wai. It is the first public housing estate in Tin Shui Wai New Town. It is divided into Tin Yiu (I) Estate and Tin Yiu (II) Estate, and consists of 12 residential buildings completed in 1992 and 1993.

Tin Yuet Estate

Tin Yuet Estate is a public housing estate in Tin Shui Wai. It consists of 6 residential buildings completed in 2000 and 2002.

Grandeur Terrace

Grandeur Terrace is a public housing estate in Tin Shui Wai. It is the only estate in Tin Shui Wai which its name does not have the prefix "Tin". It was a HOS and PSPS court, and it is the largest PSPS in Hong Kong with 4,100 residential units. It was jointly developed by the Housing Authority and Rich Score Development Ltd, a wholly owned subsidiary of Chun Wo Holdings Limited. It started construction in 2000 and was completed in 2003. When completion, the estate was transferred to public rental housing.

See also
 Public housing in Hong Kong
 Public housing estates in Yuen Long
 List of public housing estates in Hong Kong

References

Tin Shui Wai
Yuen Long District